Melissa is a comune in the province of Crotone, in Calabria. The village Melissa is situated in the mountainous inland, while the frazione of Torre Melissa is on the Ionian Sea coast. The Melissa DOC is a Calabrian wine region.

History
Melissa is mentioned for the first time in 13th century documents. It was a fief of the de Micheli family (1463–66), Venetian nobles based in Calabria, of the Campitelli  family (1485–1688) and, later, to the Pignatelli (1688–1806).

In 1949 it was the location of a massacre, when the police shot against the population, killing three people.

Twin towns
Melissa is twinned with:

  Gattatico, Italy
  Sant'Ilario d'Enza, Italy

References

Cities and towns in Calabria